Portland High School is located in Portland, Tennessee, United States, just north of Metro Nashville. It is part of Sumner County Schools. PHS offers courses including two foreign languages, sciences, social studies, math, English, welding, agricultural studies, family and consumer sciences, cosmetology, art, and band.

PHS has a school population of approximately 1200 students in grades 9–12.

Founding 
Serving as the flagship for Sumner County education, Portland High School was the first four-year public high school in the county. The school began in 1874 as Portland Seminary and sat on a  plot of land donated by J.C. Buntin, the son of the town's founder. The building had two stories, the second being used by the Grange. The first story was also used for church services. In 1897 the principal of the school, Professor Z.K. Griffin, was conducting a lab experiment when a fire broke out destroying the building.

1898 - 1915
A new building was completed in 1898 and was called Portland Seminary. The building was used until abandoned in 1915. From 1910 until 1915, the school was called Portland High School, but it only provided three years of secondary education. Pat W. Kerr was principal from 1910 to 1913. In 1913, P.L. Lloyd became principal and served until 1914, when John W. Williams assumed the position. Almost immediately, the student body outgrew the building. A new school was built in 1915 and was christened Sumner County High School, the first four-year public high school in the county. It had no library, no labs, and only one teacher with a college degree.

1927 - 1942
B. F. Smith followed Mr. Williams as principal; he served from 1927 until 1931. During this period, the Sumner County Board of education promised a new school building for the increasing student body, a promise fulfilled during the 1931–32 school year. Mr. Smith was succeeded by C.F. Allen, who served from 1931–1935.

Serving as principals for the next several years were Harry Law (1935–1937), Lee Harris (1937–1939), and C.L. Cummings (1939–1942). In 1940, under the leadership of Mr. Cummings, Sumner County High School became the first accredited high school in the county, receiving this honor from the Southern Association of Secondary Schools.

1943 - 1974
Following Mr. Cummings were principals C.O. Jett (1943–1945), E.V. Walling (1945–47), William Hunter, and Clarence Terry. By 1956, the school's teaching staff had undergone a major change, with almost 100% of the teachers holding college degrees. In the fall of 1960, an alumnus, William Coker, became principal and served until the beginning of the school year in 1974. In 1971, Mr. Carl Fussell became the first part-time vice principal. This position became full-time in 1973 with the hire of Mr. John Meece, who served as vice principal until 1984 when he assumed the principalship

Renaming in 1962
The year 1961 saw the last graduating class from Sumner County High School. In January 1962, the school moved into a new building on South Broadway, and the name returned to Portland High School, as other areas of the county were now offering public secondary education. The old school building became Portland Junior High. The building burned in 1967, leaving only the gym, which is now called Richland Gym. Following the fire, the junior high and high school classes met in the same building using split sessions until a new junior high/middle school could be built.

1974 - 1978
When William Coker retired from the principalship in 1974, John Meece became interim principal for several months. Then Jim Stephens became principal, serving from the late fall of 1974 to the fall of 1978. In 1976, a new Sumner County Vocational Center was begun at an adjacent building to the high school. The classes served students from Portland, White House, and Westmoreland. The Principal of the Vocational Center from 1976–1979 was Mr. Ronnie Dowell. Mr. Thomas Utley served as principal of the Vocational Center in 1980–1993, and from 1994–1998, he served as the Assistant Vocational Director of Upper Sumner County and Principal of the Alternative School, which was also housed in the Vocational Center.

1978 - 1994
Harvey Foster took over the administration of the schools in 1978 and served until 1984 when John Meece was appointed principal. Mr. Jim Butler served as vice principal from 1985 to 1986. Under Mr. Meece's direction, the school expanded its physical facilities with the addition of the new wing and the renovation of the library and office space in 1986. The primary purpose of this expansion was the accommodation of the freshman class, which was moved from the junior high to the high school in 1986, increasing the student body by one fourth. Mr. Ron Taylor served as vice principal from 1986 to 1994.

1994 - 2007
After Mr. Meece moved to the central office in the spring of 1994, Calvin Short became principal in the fall of 1994. At this time, Ms. Janet Grogan and Mr. Fred Lazenby became vice principals. The Sumner County Vocational Center officially became a part of Portland High School. Before his retirement in November 1998, Mr. Short oversaw the planning and building of the new school located at 600 College Street.

Having formerly served as interim principal from January to July 1994 and as assistant principal from July 1994 to November 1998, Janet Grogan became principal in November 1998. Mr. Dale Sprouse became the new vice principal at this time. In 2002, Mr. Fred Lazenby retired from his vice principalship. Mr. Sprouse retired in the spring of 2005 and Robin Venable was hired in his place. Ms. Grogan retired in 2007. Robert Gideon was hired for the principal's position after Ms. Grogan's retirement. Also in 2007, Cam McClean was hired as an assistant principal.

Notable alumni
Graduates of Portland High School include Samuel Collins (Class of 1916) who became a full professor at Massachusetts Institute of Technology in 1946. Noted for his work with nitrogen and helium, he built the world's first helium liquifier, the first airborne oxygen generator, and the first portable oxygen carrier for aircraft crews. Holding over sixty patents, he is known as the Father of Cryogenics.

Other graduates include famed Watergate prosecutor James Neal (Class of 1946), Robert Riggs (Class of 1960), who became the youngest president of a four-year university in the United States when he accepted the position at Austin Peay University, and noted country music entertainer and artist, Ronnie McDowell (Class of 1968). Corey Brewer, 2004 PHS graduate, went on to play and start at the University of Florida for three years, where he was named the Final Four MVP in 2007. He became the 7th draft pick for the 2007 NBA Draft to play for the Houston Rockets.

References

External links

Public high schools in Tennessee
Schools in Sumner County, Tennessee